Doug Johnson, Jr. (born October 27, 1977) is an American former college and professional football player who was a quarterback in the National Football League (NFL) for five seasons during the early 2000s.  Johnson played college football for the University of Florida, and thereafter, he played professionally for the Atlanta Falcons, the Jacksonville Jaguars, the Cincinnati Bengals, the Cleveland Browns, and the Tennessee Titans of the NFL. He has two children and a wife. He is in the Florida Georgia Hall of fame and also played in the MLB for the Tampa Bay Devil Rays. He was the third baseman and the pitcher he played for 2 years.

Early years 

Johnson was born in Gainesville, Florida in 1977.  He attended in Buchholz High School in Gainesville, where he was a stand-out high school football and baseball player for the Buchholz Bobcats.

College career 
Johnson accepted an athletic scholarship to attend the University of Florida in Gainesville, where he was a quarterback for coach Steve Spurrier's Florida Gators football team from 1996 to 1999.  Memorably, Johnson threw for 460 yards and seven touchdowns against the Central Michigan Chippewas in 1997, setting a Southeastern Conference (SEC) record for most touchdown passes in a game, and an NCAA Division I record for most touchdown passes in a half.  In three seasons as the Gators' principal starter, he threw for 7,114 yards, sixty-two touchdowns and thirty-six interceptions, completing 504 of 907 attempts, and was selected as a team captain as a senior.

College statistics

Professional career 

After graduating from Florida, Johnson was not selected in the 2000 NFL Draft, but signed with the Atlanta Falcons as a free agent.  As an Atlanta Falcon in 2002, Johnson led the team to a 17–10 victory in a start against the New York Giants.  In the game, Johnson completed 19 of 25 passes for 257 yards and one passing and one rushing touchdown.  In four seasons with the Falcons, he started eleven games and passed for 2,600 yards.  He has since played three additional seasons, mostly as a back-up or practice squad quarterback for three different teams.  On September 1, 2007, he was released by the Cincinnati Bengals after playing the preseason as a backup to Carson Palmer.

Johnson was also a second-round draft pick in 1996 for the Tampa Bay Devil Rays, playing as a third baseman in their minor league system in 1996 and 1997 before suffering a rotator cuff injury and leaving to concentrate on football full-time.

Football Outsiders uses the term called "the Doug Johnson Effect," referring to "part-time players who had a very good performance the previous season in only one or two games," as a caution against overvaluing NFL players for the next season.

See also 

 Florida Gators football, 1990–99
 History of the Atlanta Falcons
 List of University of Florida alumni

References

Bibliography 

 Carlson, Norm, University of Florida Football Vault: The History of the Florida Gators, Whitman Publishing, LLC, Atlanta, Georgia (2007).  .
 Golenbock, Peter, Go Gators!  An Oral History of Florida's Pursuit of Gridiron Glory, Legends Publishing, LLC, St. Petersburg, Florida (2002).  .
 Hairston, Jack, Tales from the Gator Swamp: A Collection of the Greatest Gator Stories Ever Told, Sports Publishing, LLC, Champaign, Illinois (2002).  .
 McCarthy, Kevin M.,  Fightin' Gators: A History of University of Florida Football, Arcadia Publishing, Mount Pleasant, South Carolina (2000).  .
 Nash, Noel, ed., The Gainesville Sun Presents The Greatest Moments in Florida Gators Football, Sports Publishing, Inc., Champaign, Illinois (1998).  .

1977 births
Living people
Players of American football from Gainesville, Florida
American football quarterbacks
Buchholz High School alumni
Florida Gators football players
Atlanta Falcons players
Jacksonville Jaguars players
Tennessee Titans players
Cincinnati Bengals players
Cleveland Browns players
Baseball players from Florida
Florida Gators baseball players